George Albert Soper II (2 February 1870 – 17 June 1948) was an American sanitation engineer. He was best known for discovering Mary Mallon, also known as Typhoid Mary, an asymptomatic carrier of typhoid fever.

Biography 
Soper was the son of George Albert Soper (1837 – 1869) and Georgianna Lydia Buckman (d. 1882).

He received his degree from Rensselaer Polytechnic Institute in 1895 and a Ph.D. from Columbia University in 1899. He was described as 'Major, US Army', in the entry for 1907 in the New York City Department of Health and was identified by Centennial Newspaper for the discovery of the carrier, Typhoid Mary. From 1923–to 1928 he was the managing director of the American Society for the Control of Cancer, which later changed its name to the American Cancer Society.

Mallon was tracked down by Soper and Dr. Sara Josephine Baker, and was arrested by Ms. Willa Carey Noble, a bacteriologist at Research laboratories of the Public Health Department of New York City under William Hallock Park.

References

Notes 
Dr. G. A. Soper dies; fought epidemics. New York Times, June 18, 1948.  p23.
:s:Author:George Albert Soper

Sources

External links

 

1870 births
Columbia School of Engineering and Applied Science alumni
1948 deaths
Rensselaer Polytechnic Institute alumni